Panaimarathupatti (also known as Panamarathupatty) is a panchayat town in Salem district in the Indian state of Tamil Nadu.

Demographics
 India census, Panaimarathupatti had a population of 8051. Males constitute 51% of the population and females 49%. Panaimarathupatti has an average literacy rate of 60%, higher than the national average of 59.5%: male literacy is 68%, and female literacy is 52%. In Panaimarathupatti, 13% of the population is under 6 years of age.

Tourism

Panamarathupatti Lake
This is a Natural Lake situated near an adikkarai Village called Panamarathupatti. Situated very near to the suburbs of Salem City. This lake is the source to meet the water needs in some parts of southern suburbs of Salem City, and the agricultural lands around the lake. The total area covered by this lake is around 500acres. Tourists are attracted by the scenic features of the lake. This lake is even called as Vedanthangal of Salem District, as the lake attracts many birds during the season. PanamarathuPatti has frequent bus services from Salem Old bus Stand. A drive will also be a good idea. It takes around 20–30 minutes to reach this place from Salem City. A deviation from Namakkal road-NH7 takes to Panamarathupatti.

Politics
Panamarathupatty assembly constituency is part of Salem (Lok Sabha constituency).

References

See also

Cities and towns in Salem district